Velta is both a surname and a given name.

Given name  

Velta is a feminine Latvian given name. Notable individuals named Velta include: 
Velta Līne (1923–2012), Latvian actress
Velta Ruke-Dravina (1917–2003), Latvian linguist and folklorist
Velta Skurstene (1930–2022), Latvian actress 
Velta Sniķere (born 1920), Latvian poet
Velta Toma (1912–1999), Latvian poet

Surname  
Notable people with the surname Velta include:
Rune Velta (born 1989), Norwegian ski jumper

References

Latvian feminine given names